The white-faced plover (Charadrius dealbatus) is a small shorebird of the family Charadriidae. Initially described by British ornithologist Robert Swinhoe, the bird resembles the Kentish plover (Charadrius alexandrinus) with which it has been much confused
and sometimes considered to be a subspecies.

Taxonomy
The white-faced plover was first described in 1870 by the English biologist Robert Swinhoe. The type specimen came from the island of Formosa (Taiwan) and he gave it the name Aegialites dealbatus. Since then the bird has been the subject of much debate and has variously been classified as being conspecific with Charadrius marginatus, Charadrius alexandrinus, Charadrius nivosus, Charadrius javanicus and Charadrius ruficapillus. Some authors consider it to be a subspecies of C. alexandrinus while others give it full species status as C. dealbatus.

Description
It has a rounded head with a white fore-crown and a white supercilium. The crown is pale rufous brown upper parts are pale brownish-grey. The hind collar, throat and underparts are white. The beak and legs are dark and the tail short. Compared to the rather similar Kentish plover, it has a thicker, blunter beak, white lores, paler crown and upperparts, less black on the lateral breast patches and a larger white wingbar.

Distribution and habitat
This bird is found along a wide seaboard area of southern China and adjacent northern Vietnam ; its wintering range extends south across eastern Indochina towards Sumatra. It typically inhabits sandy beaches, mudflats and saltpans, and outside the breeding season visits reclaimed areas.

Ecology
The diet of this bird has been little studied but is presumed to be similar to that of the Kentish plover which feeds on small invertebrates such as insects and their larvae, spiders, molluscs, crustaceans and marine worms. It feeds on the foreshore, searching visually for prey then dashing forward to catch the prey or probing the substrate with its beak. Its breeding habits are not known.

References

External links
White-Faced Plover

white-faced plover
Birds of South China
Fauna of Vietnam
white-faced plover
Controversial bird taxa
Taxa named by Robert Swinhoe